Saving Britain's Past is a British factual television series presented by Tom Dyckhoff that was first broadcast on BBC Two on 20 January 2009.

Production
Rodney Harrison and Susie West (from the Open University were academic consultants to the show. Later they used the DVD of the show to create a module 'Understanding Global Heritage' as part of a Heritage Studies course for the University.

Episode 1 included the City of Bath; episode 2, Park Hill, Sheffield; episode 3, Eastnor Castle; and episode 4, Covent Garden.

Reviews
"Tom Dyckhoff has a rather dry style, which didn't exactly make the most of the subject matter. Though there were some intriguing snippets of information, this wasn't really the most accessible format for the general viewer". Was one review of the show.
 
"Dyckhoff emphasises the "battles" with breathless superlatives. Instead, some major issues of conservation are intelligently aired: the conflict between heritage and environmentalism in retaining traditional rural land management; or that conservation of the physical doesn't necessarily include the community".

Episode list

Later released as a DVD running 420 mins.

References

External links
  
 
 

2009 British television series debuts
2009 British television series endings
2009 in the environment
Television shows set in the United Kingdom
BBC television documentaries
English-language television shows
Environmental issues in the United Kingdom